Sepych is a rural locality (a selo) in Vereshchaginsky District, Perm Krai, Russia. The population was 1,264 as of 2010. There are 19 streets.

Geography 
Sepych is located 45 km northwest of Vereshchagino (the district's administrative centre) by road. Yenino is the nearest rural locality.

References 

Rural localities in Vereshchaginsky District